The despot of Epirus was the ruler of the Despotate of Epirus, one of the successor states of the Byzantine Empire in the aftermath of the Fourth Crusade. The name "Despotate of Epirus" and the title "despot of Epirus" are modern historiographical names, and were not in use by the despots themselves. In the Byzantine Empire, the title of despot was a prestigious court title and did not designate rule over some specific territory. Though several of the early Greek rulers of the Epirote realm did use the title of despot, it was never in reference to the lands they governed, but instead in reference to their position in the imperial hierarchy.

It was only with Epirus falling into the hands of foreign dynasties that the title of despot became applied not to the imperial hierarchy, but to the territory, sometimes to the dismay of the local population. "Despot of Epirus" is not recorded in contemporary documents for the rulers of foreign origin, but several other versions are, such as "despot of Arta" and "despot of Ioannina", the two capitals of the despotate at different points in time. Some rulers used the version "despot of Romania" (Romania essentially referring to the territories of the Roman Empire, i.e. Byzantium) or "despot of the Romans" (claiming rulership over the Romans, i.e. the Byzantines/Greeks).

The final despot of Epirus was Leonardo III Tocco, who ruled from 1448 to 1479, when the remnants of the despotate were conquered by the Ottoman Empire. Leonardo escaped into exile and his descendants continued to claim the title until 1642, when the titular despot Antonio Tocco abandoned it and instead claimed the title of prince of Achaea.

Title 
In the Late Byzantine Empire, the title of despot was a prestigious and elevated court title. It was not used as a ruling title in regards to any specific landed possession. As such, referring to the rulers of the Despotate of Epirus (a non-contemporary term for the state) as "Despots of Epirus" is technically incorrect. The title only became associated with certain territories as the practice of emperors granting the title to princes and granting them semi-authonomous appanages to govern became regularized. Furthermore, not all rulers of Epirus bore the title. The founder of the Epirote realm, Michael I Komnenos Doukas, never used the title and neither did his successor Theodore Komnenos Doukas, who actually crowned himself emperor at Thessalonica . The first ruler of Epirus to receive the title of despot was Michael II, from his uncle Manuel of Thessalonica in the 1230s, and then again, as a sign of submission and vassalage, from the Nicaean emperor John III Vatatzes.

Use of a version of the title despot actually associated with territory began under the rule of the Orsini family, following the extinction of the original Komnenos Doukas dynasty. Epirus was a part of Romania (not meaning the modern country, but essentially "the territories of the Roman Empire", i.e. Byzantium). Thomas II Preljubović, who was granted Epirus by its previous ruler, claimant Serbian emperor Simeon Uroš, was granted the dignity of despot by Simeon and titled himself as the "Despot of Ioannina" to designate his rule over his capital Ioannina and all of Epirus.

Upon becoming the ruler of Ioannina in 1411, Carlo I Tocco assumed the title of despot, either as a reference to the Komnenos Doukas and Orsini despots, or to the title assumed by Thomas II Preljubović. The locals insisted that Carlo seek recognition of that title from the Byzantine emperor, and after having sent his brother Leonardo to Constantinople, Emperor Manuel II Palaiologos formally recognized him as despot. To Carlo, the title of despot meant that he could claim rulership over all of Epirus, not just Ioannina; he notably captured Arta, capital under the Komnenos Doukas and Orsini, in 1416. To the Byzantines in Constantinople, the granting of the title served more to buffer the lack of actual imperial control in the region, only being a nominal reference to the power previously exercised in Epirus by Greek despots. From 1418 onwards, Carlo rendered his title in Latin as Despotus Romaniae, as the Orsini despots had done before him. This title had also been used by Centurione II Zaccaria, Prince of Achaea, and Carlo might have assumed it in 1418 not as a reference to previous rulers of Epirus, but essentially as a usurpation of Centurione's (his former feudal overlord) title after the Prince of Achaea had suffered devastating losses of territory to the Byzantines in that same year. Epirote sources write that the title  was confirmed by Manuel II, but contemporary Byzantine sources are silent on the matter. Documents from Ioannia and Arta give Carlo the full title  ("Lord Carlo, by the grace of God, Despot of Romania").

Carlo also sometimes used the version  ("Despot of the Romans", i.e. the Byzantines/Greeks) from 1418 onwards. This version of the title had even more dangerous implications for Constantinople, as it implied rulership over the Byzantine people themselves rather than territory they considered part of their empire. To the Byzantines, such power could only legally be exercised by the emperor. Carlo I's successor, Carlo II Tocco, used the title "Despot of Arta", which connected him to the old capital of the Epirote realm rather than to the territory of the Byzantine Empire at large. Even then, "Despot of Arta" was no more acceptable to the Byzantines than "Despot of Romania" as it was still in relation to a specific territory, rather than on the position of a despot relative to the emperor in court hierarchy. This title was also used by Carlo II's successor, Leonardo III Tocco. Later members of the Tocco family, pretenders to the title, used both "Despot of Romania" and "Despot of Arta"; a 1697 Italian text titles the despots of the Tocco family as Despoti de Romanìa, & del'Arta ("Despots of Romania and of Arta").

List of despots of Epirus, 1205–1479

Komnenos Doukas dynasty (1205–1318)

Orsini dynasty (1318–1359)

Nemanjić dynasty (1359–1385)

Buondelmonti dynasty (1385–1411)

Tocco dynasty (1411–1479)

Titular despots of Epirus, 1479–1642 

With Antonio Tocco's abandonment of the title in the 17th century, the Tocco family ceased to use the title Despot of Epirus. Antonio's male-line descendants instead continued the use of the title Prince of Achaea. The change in titulature might be attributable to the Tocchi being the most senior descendants of Thomas Palaiologos, Despot of the Morea, following the extinction of his last certain male-line descendants in the 16th century. Thomas Palaiologos had married the heiress of Centurione II Zaccaria, the last Prince of Achaea, and had inherited the territories of the principality upon Centurione's death in 1432.

Notes

References

Bibliography

Web sources 

 
Lists of monarchs
Lists of medieval people
Byzantine Empire-related lists
Despots of Epirus